Dan P. McAdams (born February 7, 1954) is personality psychologist and the Henry Wade Rogers Professor in the Department of Psychology at Northwestern University.

He was raised in Gary, Indiana, where he attended nearby Valparaiso University. In 1979 he was awarded a Ph.D. from the Harvard Department of Social Relations.

McAdams is the author of The Person: An Introduction to the Science of Personality Psychology, a classroom textbook. He co-edited, with Amia Lieblich and Ruthellen Josselson, the eleven-book series "The Narrative Study of Lives". He is a member of The Human Capital and Economic Opportunity Working Group at the Becker Friedman Institute for Research in Economics.

Three Levels of Personality
McAdams' three level model of personality was used in Jonathan Haidt's The Happiness Hypothesis The three levels are :
  Dispositional traits, a person's general tendencies. For example, the Big Five personality traits lists: Openness, Conscientiousness, Extraversion, Agreeableness, Neuroticism.
  Characteristic adaptations, a person's desires, beliefs, concerns, and coping mechanisms.
  Life stories, the stories that give a life a sense of unity, meaning, and purpose. This is known as narrative identity.

Publication

Bibliography
Selected publications:
 McAdams, D. P. (2015). "The art and science of personality development" New York: The Guilford Press
 McAdams, D. P.  (2011). "George W. Bush and the redemptive dream: A psychological portrait." New York: Oxford University Press.
 McAdams, D. P., & Olson, B.  (2010). "Personality development:  Continuity and change over the life course." In S. Fiske, D. Schacter, and R. Sternberg (Eds.), Annual Review of Psychology (Vol. 61, pp. 517–542).  Palo Alto, CA:  Annual Reviews, Inc.
 Bauer, J. J., & McAdams, D. P.  (2010). "Eudaimonic growth:  Narrative growth goals predict increases in ego development and subjective well-being 3 years later." Developmental Psychology, 46, 761–772.
 McAdams, D. P.  (2009). "The person:  An introduction to the science of personality psychology" (5th Ed.).  New York: Wiley.
 McAdams, Dan P. (2008). Foreword to Explorations in Personality, by Henry A. Murray. New York: Oxford University Press.
 McAdams, D. P., Albaugh, M., Farber, E., Daniels, J., Logan, R. L., & Olson, B.  (2008).  "Family metaphors and moral intuitions:  How conservatives and liberals narrate their lives." Journal of Personality and Social Psychology, 95, 978–990.
 McAdams, D. P., & Pals, J. L.  (2006). "A new Big Five: Fundamental principles for an integrative science of personality." American Psychologist, 61, 204–217.
 McAdams, D. P.  (2006). "The redemptive self: Stories Americans live by." New York: Oxford University Press.
 McAdams, D. P., Josselson, R. & Lieblich, A. (2001). "Turns in the road : narrative studies of lives in transition" Washington, DC : American Psychological Association.

Articles and essays
 McAdams, D. P., & Guo, J.  (2015).  Narrating the generative life.  Psychological Science, 26, 475–483.
 Manczak, E., Zapata-Gietl, C., & McAdams, D. P.  (2014).  Regulatory focus in the life story:  Prevention and promotion as expressed in three layers of personality.  Journal of Personality and Social Psychology, 106, 169–181.
 McAdams, D. P.  (2013).  The psychological self as actor, agent, and author.  Perspectives on Psychological Science, 8, 272–295.
 McAdams, D.P. (1995). What do we know when we know a person? Journal of Personality. 63:3, 365 - 396. Duke University Press.

References

21st-century American psychologists
1954 births
Living people
Harvard University alumni
Personality psychologists
Valparaiso University alumni
20th-century American psychologists